Occult Wars is a tabletop skirmish war game designed by Stealthy Spider Publishing. Players represent rival gangs, clans, or packs of humans, vampires, werewolves, angels, zombies, demons, and other similar creatures.  
Also included are rules for making mixed gangs consisting of, for example, humans and werewolves.

The game rules include methods for designing creatures with different types of strengths and weaknesses.  
For example, players can create vampires that are invulnerable to sunlight and crucifixes, 
but have weaknesses to electricity and gold.  The rules also include a system 
for character advancement, similar to those of many role-playing games, allowing players to create 
campaigns linking together multiple games.

According to the publishers, Occult Wars is recommended for people aged 14 years and older.

External links
 Occult Wars at Stealthy Spider Publishing
 Occult Wars review at Mainly 28s...

Miniature wargames
Wargames introduced in the 2000s